Aleksandr Bykov (born 23 January 1953) is a Soviet fencer. He competed in the individual and team épée events at the 1976 Summer Olympics.

References

1953 births
Living people
Russian male fencers
Soviet male fencers
Olympic fencers of the Soviet Union
Fencers at the 1976 Summer Olympics